Elephant Adventure is a 1964 children's book by the Canadian-born American author Willard Price featuring his "Adventure" series characters, Hal and Roger Hunt. It is set in the Mountains of the Moon in Uganda and depicts Hal and Roger's attempts to capture elephants for a zoo.

Enemies
Their enemies are a group of slave hunters. They kidnapped some villagers and cut an elephant's trunk when the animal resisted their capture. (Hal had to shoot the elephant, much to Roger's protest. Hal explained that they were in the jungle and no one could save the trunk. An elephant will die without a trunk).

Animal
- During their search of the villagers, they spotted a white elephant. After they escape from the slave hunters, they return to capture the white elephant.

1964 American novels
1964 children's books
Books about elephants
Novels set in Uganda
Novels by Willard Price
Jonathan Cape books